Wah Fu Estate is a public housing estate located next to Waterfall Bay, Pok Fu Lam in Hong Kong's Southern District. It was built on a new town concept in 1967 and was renovated in 2003. Divided into Wah Fu (I) Estate and Wah Fu (II) Estate, the whole estate has a total of 18 residential blocks completed between 1967 and 1978.

There are several primary and secondary schools in the estate, including Pui Ying Secondary School, SKH Lui Ming Choi Secondary School and Caritas Chong Yut Ming Secondary School. They provide education to children in the estate and the surrounding areas. Fortuna Theatre is the only cinema on the estate.

Houses

Redevelopment
Announced in the chief executive's 2014 Policy Address, Wah Fu Estate will be redeveloped. The new estate will be built nearby. It is planned that after the Wah Fu residents have moved to the new estates, Wah Fu will be redeveloped starting from 2024.

Education
Wah Fu Estate is in Primary One Admission (POA) School Net 18. Within the school net are multiple aided schools (operated independently but funded with government money) and Hong Kong Southern District Government Primary School (香港南區官立小學).

Notable residents
Legal
Wong Yan-lung (黃仁龍): Former Secretary for Justice, lived in the estate in the 1970s/1980s.
Miles Jackson-Lipkin
Media and entertainment
Kitty Yuen (阮小儀): Disc jockey with Commercial Radio Hong Kong, former actress with TVB.
Wakin Chau (周華健): Singer
Halina Tam (譚小環): Actress/presenter, Winner of the Miss Hong Kong Pageant 1994.
Wai Ka-fai (韋家輝): Film producer and former TVB producer

References

External links

 Hong Kong map of Wah Fu Estate

Residential buildings completed in 1967
Residential buildings completed in 1968
Residential buildings completed in 1969
Residential buildings completed in 1970
Residential buildings completed in 1971
Residential buildings completed in 1978
Waterfall Bay, Hong Kong
Pok Fu Lam
Public housing estates in Hong Kong
1967 establishments in Hong Kong
Housing estates with centralized LPG system in Hong Kong